The lac Bazile is a body of water on the hydrographic side of the Petit Saguenay River, in the unorganized territory of Mont-Élie, in the Charlevoix-Est Regional County Municipality of the administrative region Capitale-Nationale, in Quebec, in Canada.

A forest road runs along the south shore of Lac Bazile. Another forest road runs along the northeast part of the lake. These roads join the Périgny road north.

Forestry is the main economic activity in the sector; recreational tourism, second.

The surface of Bazile Lake is usually frozen from the end of November to the beginning of April, however the safe circulation on the ice is generally done from mid-December to the end of March.

Geography 
The main watersheds near Lake Bazile are:
 north side: Bras à Pierre;
 east side: Petit Saguenay River;
 south side: Pont stream, Malbaie River;
 west side: Épinglette brook, Coulée du Bazile, Malbaie River.

This lake takes the shape of a turtle back.

The mouth of Lac Bazile is located at:
  west of Lac des Caleçons;
  west of Lac au Bouleau;
  south-west of the village of Sagard where the route 170 passes;
  south of the mouth of the Petit Saguenay River at L'Anse-Saint-Jean.

Toponymy 
The term "Bazile" is a first name of French origin.

The toponym Lac Bazile was formalized on December 5, 1968, by the Commission de toponymie du Québec.

References

Related articles 
 Le Fjord-du-Saguenay Regional County Municipality
 Mont-Élie, a TNO
 Petit Saguenay River
 Lac au Sable

Lakes of Capitale-Nationale